Hasanabad (also Romanized as Ḩasanābād) is a village in Dastjerd Rural District, Khalajastan District, Qom County, Qom Province, Iran. As of the 2006 census, its population was 66, in 22 families.

References 

Populated places in Qom Province